Magdalena Wilhelmine of Württemberg (7 November 1677, Stuttgart – 30 October 1742, Karlsburg Castle, Durlach) was a margravine of Baden. She had a place in the regency during the minority of her grandson in 1738-42.

Life
She was the daughter of Duke William Louis of Württemberg and Landgravine Magdalena Sibylla of Hesse-Darmstadt.  In order to strengthen the ties between Baden and Württemberg, she married on 27 June 1697 the Hereditary Prince of Baden and later Margrave Charles William of Baden-Durlach.  As Magdalena Wilhelmine had a big nose and blemishes, she did not meet the ideals of beauty held by Karl Wilhelm, who loved beautiful women.  After they had a son and heir, the couple separated.  When in 1715 Charles William founded his new residence Karlsruhe, he alone moved into the new palace, while his wife remained in the Karlsburg Castle.

After Charles III William died in 1738, Magdalena Wilhelmine held a post in the  guardian government for her nine-year-old grandson Charles Frederick.  After her death she was buried in the margraviate tomb in St. Michael's church in Pforzheim .

Issue
 Karl Magnus (born January 21, 1701 – died January 12, 1712), Hereditary Prince of Baden-Durlach
 Frederick (October 7, 1703 – March 26, 1732), Hereditary Prince of Baden-Durlach
 Auguste Magdalena (born November 13, 1706 – September 25, 1709)

Ancestors

Sources
 Annette Borchardt-Wenzel:Karl Friedrich von Baden. Man and the legend. Katz, Gernsbach 2006, .

|-

18th-century women rulers
1677 births
1742 deaths
Duchesses of Württemberg
Daughters of monarchs